I Am Not Afraid of You and I Will Beat Your Ass is the eleventh full-length album by American indie rock band Yo La Tengo, released on September 12, 2006 by record label Matador.

Content 
The title of the album is rumored to be a (paraphrased) quote by NBA player Tim Thomas. Sitting on the bench together during a game, Thomas was caught on tape by the MSG Network in a profane exchange with fellow Knick, point guard Stephon Marbury. Thomas yelled at Marbury, "Everyone in this organization is afraid of you, but I'm not, and I will beat your ass".

Release 
The record was released on CD and as a double LP vinyl.

A 7" single for "Mr. Tough" was released in the UK, September 4, 2006. On the B-side there is a cover of "I'm Your Puppet" by James & Bobby Purify.

Reception

The album has received widespread acclaim and appeared in numerous "Best of 2006" lists, including:
 a rating of 85% on Metacritic
 appearing at number 13 on Metacritic's "Best of 2006" list.
 appearing at number 23 on Pitchfork's "Top 50 Albums of 2006"

Track listing
All songs written by Georgia Hubley, Ira Kaplan and James McNew.

The final track is a deliberate misspelling of the band's name — the album's CD-Text reiterating this by listing the track as "The Story of Yo La Tango", followed by the message "Yes — it should be Tango!".  A recurring feature on the band's web site depicts venue marquees with various misspellings of the name.

Personnel
Mastered by Greg Calbi at Sterling Sound.

Steve Herrman – trumpet ("Mr. Tough", "Black Flowers")
Jim Hoke – saxophone ("Mr. Tough", "Watch Out for Me Ronnie")
Bill Huber – trombone ("Beanbag Chair", "Black Flowers") and euphonium ("Black Flowers")
David Mansfield – violin ("I Feel Like Going Home", "Black Flowers")
Roger Moutenot – acoustic guitar ("Song for Mahila")
Garo Yellin – cello ("Black Flowers", "Watch Out for Me Ronnie")

Art
Cover painting: Little Pink Lady by Gary Panter
Photos by Reuben Cox
Inlay photo of Ira as a kid was taken by Abraham Kaplan (Ira's father)
Inlay photo of Ira and Georgia's dog, named Sydney, was taken by Georgia

Charts

References

External links
 

2006 albums
Yo La Tengo albums
Avant-pop albums